John Elwood "Waddy" Davis (September 18, 1892 – January 9, 1974) was an American football player and coach of football and baseball.

Playing career
Davis graduated from the University of Iowa in Iowa City.  He played football for the Iowa Hawkeyes and was captain of the football team.

Coaching career

High school coaching
Davis coached in the high school ranks in Iowa from 1917 to 1919.

Kansas Wesleyan
Davis was the eighth head football coach at Kansas Wesleyan University in Salina, Kansas, serving for one season, in 1920 and compiling a record of 0–1–2.

Death
David died on January 9, 1974, at a hospital in Iowa City, Iowa.

References

External links
 

1892 births
1974 deaths
American football halfbacks
Iowa Hawkeyes baseball coaches
Iowa Hawkeyes football coaches
Iowa Hawkeyes football players
Kansas Wesleyan Coyotes football coaches
Washington University Bears football coaches
Western Washington Vikings football coaches
College track and field coaches in the United States
High school football coaches in Iowa
People from Woodbury County, Iowa
Players of American football from Iowa